J Thankima College is located at Bawngkawn, Aizawl, Mizoram.

History
The college is named after J Thankima. It was started in 1992, it was upgraded to Deficit Grant-in-aid Status with effect from 2002 and it became a Government College with effect from 2007. The College was named after J Thankima after he came forward to sponsor the College in 1995. It was a difict college in 2002. It was merged with Lalhmingthanga College, Durtlang on 11 October 2007. J Thankima College is affiliated to Mizoram University

Departments
The college offers Bachelor of Arts degree in English, Mizo, History, Education, Economics and Political Science. The college has recently started the BBA program from 26 July 2018 onwards.

Campus

J Thankima college is located at Bawngkawn Brigade locality of Aizawl, It is 8,19 square metres. With funding from NLCPR, a few number of college buildings have been built in the campus.

See also
Education in India
Education in Mizoram
Mizoram University
Literacy in India

References

External links

Universities and colleges in Mizoram
Colleges affiliated to Mizoram University
Education in Aizawl